Kabutar Khaneh (also Romanized as Kabūtar Khāneh) is a village in Azari Rural District, in the Central District of Esfarayen County, North Khorasan Province, Iran. At the 2006 census, its population was 337, in 90 families.

References 

Populated places in Esfarayen County